William Ernst Trautmann (July 1, 1869 – November 18, 1940) was founding general-secretary of the Industrial Workers of the World (IWW) and one of 69 people who initially laid plans for the organization in 1904.

He was born to German parents in New Zealand in 1869 and raised in Europe. After completing a brewing apprenticeship in Poland, he worked as a masterbrewer in Germany before being expelled for labor activities under Bismark's anti-socialist laws. In 1890 he moved to the United States, where he joined the Beer Brewers Union. Trautmann was a key figure in the United Brewery Workers' Union in Milwaukee and the editor of the United Brewery Workers' German-language newspaper, Brauer Zeitung. He was expelled from that union for his participation in the founding IWW convention. In 1905, he joined with other industrial unionists to found the Industrial Workers of the World. Between 1905 and 1912, he mostly worked in the field as an organizer. In 1912, he broke with the IWW leadership over strike tactics and the alleged misuse of funds collected for the "Bread and Roses" strike in Lawrence, Massachusetts. In 1913, Trautmann joined the so-called yellow IWW created by the Socialist Labor Party, which later became the Workers' International Industrial Union (WIIU), as a "full-time propagandist."

In 1922, Trautmann published a novel, Riot, drawing on his experiences as an IWW activist during the Pressed Steel Car Strike of 1909 in McKees Rocks (Pittsburgh, Pennsylvania).

Early life
Born in New Zealand into a German-American miner family in 1869. His father died when Trautmann was four years of age. When he was 14 he and his mother moved back to Europe where he worked as an apprentice to a brewer in Poland. At this brewery he had to work as many as hours as his brewmaster told him. It was during this time that Trautmann was exposed to the radical labor ideas that would become his life's work. Trautmann worked throughout Eastern Europe before settling in Germany. In Germany he was a vocal supporter of workers going through the same abuse in the brewing industry that he had gone through. In 1890 he was forced to leave Germany under the  new anti-Socialist laws, which marked him as a dangerous radical. He decided to move to the United States as he already had family there. He moved to Massachusetts and continued to organize labor. He was very active in the United Brewery Worker Union. He was also very vocal against the American Federation of Labor, who he saw as being too conservative and not looking out for the interest of the worker.

Time in IWW
Trautmann was one of the founders of the Industrial Workers of the World. He helped write the Industrial Union Manifesto, one of the IWW's founding documents. While in the Industrial Workers of the World Trautmann worked as an organizer, propagandist, and for some time as secretary-treasurer. He was much more known for his essays than for his administrative skills. His works include One Big Union, Why Strikes are Lost & How to Win, and Industrial Unionism: The Hope of the Workers.  He was thrust into a leadership role with the resignation of Eugene Debs from the union, and while he was a skilled writer his administrative skills were lacking. He could not keep a record of the members of the union (that is both the individuals and the different local branches of the IWW), and at the 1906 IWW convention, it was discovered that Trautmann had not been keeping a financial record for the entire year.

His start in the IWW was also met with turbulent times. He failed many of his first attempts at organizing strikes. He switched his tactics to target primarily Eastern European immigrants, since he was also one. This lead him to the McKees Rocks strike, a strike in a steel town of Pennsylvania. Trautmann tried to keep the protests peaceful, but soon violence erupted. Five state troopers were killed, and Trautmann was arrested. Thousands of workers threatened to riot if he was not released, and their demands met. Eventually the factory operators met the workers' demands and Trautmann achieved his first labor victory.

Trautmann was also a part of the schisms that happened during the 1910s in the IWW. In 1906 Trautmann, and his allies Vincent St. John, and Daniel DeLeon found themselves at odds with the President of the IWW, Charles Sherman. Sherman had a more conservative view (as far as unions went) and many in the IWW feared that he would allow the union to become more of an AFL type. Some members thought that Sherman would try to work within the confines of the capitalist system rather than trying to change the system as many in the IWW were trying to do. Trautmann and his allies were a proponent of "direct action", the use of strikes and sabotage to achieve the aims of the union. The Trautmann faction was able to rally enough to support to outvote Sherman and his supporters, and were able to take control of the IWW.

With an even greater leadership role in the union Trautmann was soon seen as being out of his depth. He was replaced as an administrator by St. John. This allowed Trautmann to be a field organizer, a job that suited him much better. He was involved in the Lawrence Strike of 1912. Despite its success Tratumann no longer believed that the direct action approach of the IWW was the right idea, and in 1913, after a brief stint in DeLeon's Yellow IWW, he left the union for good.

Post IWW Life
Trautmann wrote a historical novel entitled Riot that was based on his experiences organizing the McKees Rocks strike. He abandoned radical politics and wrote America's Dilemma in which he said, "Millions of toilers are today agreed that not capitalism, not the employers of labor as a class, are the enemies of the workers so much as those who, claiming to spring from the ranks of the proletariat, have become the apostles of corruption, the promoters of crime, the fomentors of chaos and destruction." He instead promoted peaceful labor reform, eventually ending up in Los Angeles where he worked on his autobiography and a New Deal highway project until his death in 1940.

References

Bibliography 
 Anonymous: The Founding Convention of the IWW - Proceedings, Merit Publishers, New York 1969. Library of Congress Catalog Number 70-85538
 Jay Miller, Mark Derby: William E. Trautmann, New Zealand Wobbly, Industrial Worker No. 1689, Seite 5, IWW, Philadelphia PA., November 2006.
 Jay Miller: Soldier of the Class War: The Life and Writing of William E. Trautmann, Wayne State University, 2000.
 Heiner Stuhlfauth: Der umherschweifende Bierbrauer: William E. Trautmann - ein deutscher Einwanderer als Impulsgeber der amerikanischen Arbeiterbewegung in Holger Marcks + Matthias Seiffert (Hg.): Die großen Streiks - Episoden aus dem Klasssenkampf, Unrast-Verlag, Münster 2008, Ss. 25-26. 
 William E. Trautmann: One big union; an outline of possible industrial organization of the working class, with chart, Charles H. Kerr, Chicago 1912.
 William E. Trautmann, Riot, Chicago Labor Printing Company, Chicago, 1922.
 William E. Trautmann, E.G. Flynn, Walker C. Smith: Direct Action + Sabotage, Charles H. Kerr, Chicago 1997.
 Fred W. Thompson and John Bekken: The Industrial Workers of the World: Its First 100 Years, IWW, Cincinnati 2006.

External links
 William E. Trautmann Papers at the Walter P. Reuther Library Wayne State University, Detroit, Michigan

Industrial Workers of the World leaders
Industrial Workers of the World members
American trade union leaders
1869 births
1940 deaths
New Zealand emigrants to the United States
American people of German descent